Pannini may refer to:
A misspelling of panini (sandwich), which is a name and also the plural of "panino"
Giovanni Paolo Pannini, Italian 18th century painter of veduta or vistas